Mile Zero is a Canadian drama film, directed by Andrew Currie and released in 2001. The film stars Michael Riley as Derek Ridley, a divorced father who abducts his son Will (Connor Widdows) after his ex-wife Allison (Sabrina Grdevich) tries to limit his contact. Currie's intention for the film was to present a nuanced understanding of the emotional vulnerability that might lead a father to act in this manner, neither demonizing him as a mainstream Hollywood film would likely have done nor portraying him as a hero; it was inspired in part by Currie's own emotions about having to spend a year away from his son while studying at the Canadian Film Centre.

The film premiered at the Cinéfest Sudbury International Film Festival in September 2001, before screening at the 2001 Vancouver International Film Festival as the opening film in the Canadian Perspectives program.

The film received three Vancouver Film Critics Circle award nominations at the Vancouver Film Critics Circle Awards 2001, for Best Canadian Film, Best Actor in a Canadian Film (Riley) and Best Director of a Canadian Film (Currie).

References

External links
 

2001 films
2001 drama films
Canadian drama films
English-language Canadian films
Films shot in British Columbia
Films directed by Andrew Currie
2000s English-language films
2000s Canadian films
English-language drama films